Tagadi is a town in northeastern Ivory Coast. It is a sub-prefecture of Bondoukou Department in Gontougo Region, Zanzan District. Seven kilometres east of town is a border crossing with Ghana.

Tagadi was a commune until March 2012, when it became one of 1126 communes nationwide that were abolished.

In 2014, the population of the sub-prefecture of Tagadi was 34,440.

Villages
The seven villages of the sub-prefecture of Tagadi and their population in 2014 are:
 Bandolé (3 914)
 Kamala (8 303)
 Kohodio (2 248)
 Marahui (11 438)
 Poukoubè (2 109)
 Sangabili (1 047)
 Tagadi (5 381)

Notes

Sub-prefectures of Gontougo
Former communes of Ivory Coast